Cryptodiscus is a genus of lichen-forming fungi in the family Stictidaceae.

Species
, Species Fungorum accepts 15 species in Cryptodiscus:

Cryptodiscus cladoniicola 
Cryptodiscus epicladonia 
Cryptodiscus foveolaris 
Cryptodiscus galaninae 
Cryptodiscus gloeocapsa 
Cryptodiscus incolor 
Cryptodiscus microstoma 
Cryptodiscus minutissimus 
Cryptodiscus muriformis 
Cryptodiscus pallidus 
Cryptodiscus pini 
Cryptodiscus pumilus 
Cryptodiscus similis 
Cryptodiscus speratus 
Cryptodiscus stereicola

References

Ostropales
Lichen genera
Ostropales genera
Taxa described in 1838
Taxa named by August Carl Joseph Corda